Bruno Souza is a Brazilian Java programmer and open source software advocate. He was President of SouJava, a Brazilian Java User Group he helped establish  which became the world's largest.

 He was one of the initiators of the Apache Harmony project to create a non-proprietary Java virtual machine.  He's known as the "Brazilian JavaMan"

Bruno is a member of the board of directors at the Open Source Initiative representing Affiliate members.  This is his second term on the OSI Board. He is also a member of the executive committee of the Java Community Process.  In 2010, he co-founded ToolsCloud, a developer tools provider.

References

External links
 Bruno Souza's homepage and weblog

Year of birth missing (living people)
Living people
Java (programming language)
Brazilian computer specialists
Members of the Open Source Initiative board of directors